Nonkosi Zoliswa Mhlantla (born 2 May 1964 in Port Elizabeth) is a judge of the Constitutional Court of South Africa.

Early life 
Mhlantla was born in Port Elizabeth in 1964 and graduated with a B.Proc from the University of Limpopo.

Legal career 
After working as an attorney for twelve years, she was appointed as a judge of the Eastern Cape High Court in 2002. Six years later, she was elevated to the SCA. During 2013, she was an acting judge on the Constitutional Court for four full terms.

Constitutional Court appointment 
In November 2015, Mhlantla was permanently appointed to the Constitutional Court of South Africa. The appointment of a woman was widely expected, after extensive criticism of the slow pace of gender transformation in the judiciary. Mhlantla replaced the late Thembile Skweyiya, who had retired over 18 months prior. This delay in finding a replacement was repeatedly criticised.

References

Judges of the Constitutional Court of South Africa
1964 births
University of Limpopo alumni
Living people